Sugako (written: 壽賀子 or 須賀子) is a feminine Japanese given name. Notable people with the name include:

, Japanese screenwriter
, Japanese anarchist and journalist

Japanese feminine given names